YelloWhite is the debut mixtape by Odd Future sub-group MellowHype. It was made available for free download on February 24, 2010, fellow Odd Future member Earl Sweatshirt's 16th birthday.

Background
The bonus tracks "rolex" and "claustroflowbic" were previously released on Hodgy Beats' debut mixtape, The Dena Tape. "blaccFriday" was later released on Mike G's second mixtape, Ali. The songs "bankRolls" & "rokRok" later appeared on Odd Future's compilation album 12 Odd Future Songs. Left Brain raps the first verse on the track "thuggin".  On the track list, the twelfth track says "freakBass" instead of "rasta".

Track listing
 All songs are produced by Left Brain.

 Notes
 Tyler, The Creator is credited as Wolf Haley on the track "blaccFriday", and as Ace Creator on the track "rasta".

References

2010 albums
Albums produced by Left Brain
Hip hop albums by American artists
Odd Future